Bryson High School can refer to:
Bryson High School (Bryson, Texas)
Bryson High School (Greenville, South Carolina)
Swain County High School (Bryson City, North Carolina)